Watercolors is a Sirius XM Radio music channel that specializes in playing smooth jazz. It is available on channel 66 on Sirius XM Radio (where it replaced Jazz Cafe for that service on November 12, 2008), as well as channel 6071 on Dish Network.

Other personalities
Trinity - programming director

Programming
 The Gallery
 Live from Watercolors
 Watercolors Exclusive World Premieres
 The Dave Koz Lounge

Core artists
Dave Koz
Brian Culbertson
Boney James
Maysa Leak
David Benoit
George Benson
Al Jarreau
Peter White
Paul Hardcastle
Diana Krall
Chris Botti
George Duke

References

XM Satellite Radio channels
Sirius Satellite Radio channels
Sirius XM Radio channels
Smooth jazz radio stations in the United States
Radio stations established in 2001